Bassett-Lowke was an English toy manufacturing company based in Northampton. Founded by Wenman Joseph Bassett-Lowke in 1898 or 1899, the company specialized in model railways, boats and ships, and construction sets. Bassett-Lowke started as a mail-order business, although it designed and manufactured some items.

The company closed in 1965, with its rights to brand acquired by Corgi Toys. When Corgi was taken over by Hornby in 2008, it secured rights to the Bassett-Lowke brand, which is still commercialising.

Overview 
Bassett-Lowke was a sales organization, contracting manufacturers such as Twining Models and Winteringham Ltd, also of Northampton. Until World War I, the company also carried models made by Bing and Märklin.

Ship models
Today the name Bassett-Lowke is mostly associated with detailed model trains but the company also had a long history of contracting skilled craftsmen to make scale military and civilian waterline ship models out of wood and wire. Dereck Head in his "Bassett-Lowke Waterline Ship Models", states that before World War One, there was such a demand for these hand-made waterline 100 ft. to 1 inch scale wooden ship models that the company had to  make available to its customers a less expensive line of waterline ship models, cast in white metal, to meet the demand. The name of the casting company supplying these inexpensive white metal ship models was B.M.C. The full name was Brighton Manufacturing Company Ltd, 32 Great St Helens, London, England. This metal casting company was a neighbour to Bassett-Lowke, within walking distance from the prominent glass display windows of the Bassett-Lowke shop located on High Holborn St. in London. At the beginning of World War One, government censors prohibited Bassett-Lowke from selling or advertising their famous line of 100 ft. to 1 inch or 1/1200 scale models of the Royal Navy. The fear was that the accuracy of these models could give vital information to the enemy. As a substitute for their line of prohibited Royal Navy ship models, Bassett-Lowke purchased the metal ship models of the Royal Navy made by B.M.C. 

The full line of B.M.C. models of the Royal Navy can be seen in the Bassett-Lowke war time catalogue reprinted in Derek Head's book, pages 11 and 15. The collaboration between Bassett-Lowke and B.M.C. was a great benefit to both companies, allowing Bassett-Lowke to have a representation of the Royal Navy in their war time catalogue and giving the small metal casting company of B.M.C. a broader venue for the sales of their metal ship models. Some confusion as to who really made the metal models resulted from the claim made in the Bassett-Lowke catalogue on page 11 of Derek Head's book that the metal models were created at great expense in 1915 by Bassett-Lowke. This claim was merely an advertising ploy used by the Bassett-Lowke copy writers to conceal the fact that the more accurate models made by Bassett-Lowke had been banned by wartime government censorship. The truth is that B.M.C. had been an independent company prior to 1915,  selling their metal waterline ship models for many years through advertisement and through shops specializing in military miniatures. Early in the century this small company had begun supplying lead waterline game models to the publishers of the Fred T. Janes Naval War Game, supplementing the pressed cork and wire waterline game models already being supplied to the game by others. In retrospect, the accomplishment of B.M.C. Is that this garage sized company had created the first metal ship models in a uniform scale to each other ever made.

These B.M.C. models were the forerunners of all the scale metal recognition models made by companies in later years such as Tremo, Viking and Authenticast. The resulting model fleet in metal carried in the Bassett-Lowke catalogue was of every class of ship in the British navy then in commission as of 1914. The models found in the collection range from the early 1882 Royal Sovereign class Pre-Dreadnoughts, some of which had been retained by the navy as bombardment ships, through to the newest Revenge class Super-Dreadnoughts which had just come into service. The 1917 Bassett-Lowke catalogue proudly boasts that "Practically every ship in the Navy has been modelled, including Super-Dreadnoughts, Battleships, Battle Cruisers, Armoured Cruisers, Light Cruisers, Destroyers, Torpedo Boats, Submarines, Mine Layers, Mine Sweepers, Troopships, Transports, Armed Liners and all Auxiliary Craft". The models were formed in lead with the wire masts cast into the hulls in a scale of one inch to 150 feet or 1/1800.  They were painted and issued in numbered boxed sets by Bassett-Lowke, the boxes labelled “H.M.S. Irresistible”. Paper flags were supplied with each set, to be cut out and applied to the masts and sternposts.

Every class of vessel was easily recognizable by the funnels, guns and masts. While rudimentary by later standards, the B.M.C. production of over 101 different castings was the first scale metal ship model fleet ever produced and established the precedent for all subsequent scale metal waterline recognition ship models. In addition to the ship models, B.M.C. produced a fort with movable guns, four lighthouses and a game featuring a large fold-out map of the Dardanelles channel showing forts and minefields. The game was supplied with fifteen metal ship models including two mine sweepers and two submarines.

The B.M.C. ship models often appear for sale on internet auctions and at toy shows. Many times at these sales the B.M.C. models are found mixed with copies made by two later companies. The B.M.C. models can be distinguished from the copies since only the B.M.C. models have full-length wire masts cast into the hulls. The first type of copies are 31 models made by "Minifigs" These are cast in solid lead, have no wire masts and have large numbers inscribed on the bottom. The second type of copies comprise a group of four models made by Crescent which are cast in pot metal. They have numbers near the starboard stern numbering B.1, B.2, B.3, or B.4. Curiously, these pot-metal models retain the same numbering system that is cast into the hulls of the four B.M.C models from which they were derived.

These Crescent copies mimic the B.M.C. castings of the B.I Duncan, B.II Swiftsure, B.III King Edward VII, and the B.IV Lord Nelson. It is unknown when Bassett-Lowke ceased carrying the B.M.C metal ship models, however Derek Head in his book on page 12, states that metal ship models continued to be carried until the 1920’s. The larger highly accurate wood and wire ship models in the scale of one inch to 1200 inches or 1:1200, continued to be sold commercially and were used by the military for recognition and war gaming purpose. Unlike the B.M.C. lead models, which are in 1/1800 scale and are obscure to most collectors, these larger highly finished 100 to 1 inch or 1/1200 scale wooden ship models are prized by collectors and command a high price.

Model Trains

Bassett-Lowke produced trains from 15-inch (381 mm) gauge live steam models to Gauge 2, Gauge 1 and 0 gauge trains.

The first 15-inch steam locomotive, test run on the Eaton Hall Railway in 1905, was Little Giant. Unlike other engines on the line, it was a replica of main-line locos, built for a public miniature railway at Blackpool. It was a quarter-scale 4-4-2 "Atlantic" tender engine, though not an exact copy of any particular prototype. That engine still exists in private ownership.

In 1909, along with Henry Greenly, W.J. Bassett-Lowke started and edited Model Railways and Locomotives Magazine.

In 1914, Bassett-Lowke produced the second "Pacific" 4-6-2 of any size built in Britain (the first was GWR 111 The Great Bear). That was John Anthony, built for a miniature railway at Staughton Manor, Cambridgeshire. It was never delivered, but after storage at Eaton Hall during World War I, was sold to the Ravenglass and Eskdale Railway and renamed Colossus. It was scrapped in 1927. Ravenglass and Eskdale had purchased another Bassett-Lowke Atlantic, the Sans Pareil.

In the 1920s, Bassett-Lowke introduced 00 gauge products. The company provided custom-built railways, and one such gauge 1 layout survives in modified format at Bekonscot Model Village in England.

In 1939, Bassett-Lowke was tasked with producing a working model of Churchill's trench-digging tank known as Cultivator No. 6.

Bassett-Lowke's decline, starting in the late 1950s, can be blamed on at least two factors: people would browse the firm's free catalogue and buy similar or nearly identical items elsewhere at lower price; and the interest in technical toys declined in the late 1950s and even more in the 1960s. Bassett-Lowke's fall was mirrored by its U.S. counterparts, the A. C. Gilbert Company and Lionel Corporation. In 1964, the company ceased retail sales and sold its shops, including one at High Holborn in London, to Beatties. Bassett-Lowke went out of business in 1965.

In 1966, the company was acquired by Messrs Riley and Derry. Around 1969, Ivan Rutherford Scott, Allen L. Levy and Roland H. Fuller apparently made an effort to revive the model railway business. In the late 1980s, Nigel Turner, a Northampton businessman, bought the business and based it next to his business, Turner's Musical Merry-Go-Round, near Wootton, Northamptonshire. In 1993, the name was revived with short-run white-metal models. These included a Burrell-type traction engine, Clayton undertype steam wagon, Burrell-type steam roller, and a London B-type bus. The name was acquired in 1996 by Corgi, which linked it with live steam 0-gauge locomotives.

Key competitors to Bassett-Lowke were Hornby and Exley. Hornby acquired Corgi in 2008 and originally continued to make the 0 gauge models before later discontinuing them. The brand name was revived by them in 2020 for a range of 00 scale steampunk models based on existing Hornby toolings.

Narrow Gauge Railways Ltd 
In 1912 W. J. Bassett-Lowke, Robert Proctor-Mitchell and John Wills set up Narrow Gauge Railways Ltd (NGR) to promote and run  railways.  An earlier company, Miniature Railways of Great Britain Ltd, went into voluntary liquidation in 1912. NGR's first railway opened in 1912 at Luna Park in the Parc des Eaux Vives, Geneva, Switzerland.  In Britain, the Ravenglass and Eskdale Railway was taken over, converted to  gauge and re-opened in 1915.  The Fairbourne Railway in Wales followed in 1916.

Hornby
The Bassett-Lowke name was purchased by Corgi after the company dissolved in 1965, who used it for Corgi Classics. Corgi (and the Bassett-Lowke brand) was bought by Hornby in 2008 who used it for traditional sheet metal railway models. In 2020 Bassett-Lowke branding was used by Hornby to launch a range of steampunk inspired railway models. In 2021 brick-based construction models with steampunk themes were released under the Bassett-Lowke branding as the 'brickpunk' range aimed at both children and adults.

Locomotives 
Bassett-Lowke locomotives were often renamed when moved to different railways, sometimes creating uncertainty about whether a locomotive is new or an old one with a new name.  The list (probably incomplete) is not definitive.  Most of Bassett-Lowke's locomotives were designed by Henry Greenly who was a contributor to Model Engineer magazine.

Class 10 Atlantic

 Little Giant for Blackpool
 Mighty Atom for Sutton Miniature Railway
 Entente Cordiale for the 1909 Exposition Internationale de l'Est de France in Nancy
 Red Dragon for the Imperial International Exhibition of 1909 at White City, London
 Green Dragon for the Imperial International Exhibition of 1909 at White City, London
 King Edward for the 1910 International and Universal Exhibition in Brussels, Belgium
 King Albert for the 1910 International and Universal Exhibition in Brussels, Belgium
 King Leopold for the 1910 International and Universal Exhibition in Brussels, Belgium
 George the Fifth for Lakeside Miniature Railway
 Hungaria (No. 19) built in 1912 originally for Luna Park Geneva, Switzerland, then taken to Vidámpark (Amusement Park), Budapest, Hungary in 1914. Boiler changed in 1952, withdrawn in 1974, taken to a scrapyard but saved by the Transport Museum. Currently displayed in Zánkafürdő Railway Station, Hungary.

Class 20 Atlantic
 Prince Edward of Wales for Fairbourne Railway
 Prince of Wales for Lakeside Miniature Railway

Class 30 Atlantic

 Synolda for Sand Hutton Miniature Railway, then to Belle Vue, Manchester, later Southend-on-Sea, currently Ravenglass and Eskdale Railway.
 Sans Pareil for Luna Park, Geneva, Switzerland, then to Ravenglass and Eskdale Railway.
 Count Louis for Count Louis Zborowski, then to Fairbourne Railway. then to Evesham Vale Light Railway and now (2019) tours railways around the UK.

Class 60 Pacific

 John Anthony for J.E.P. Howey, then (renamed Colossus) to Ravenglass and Eskdale Railway.

The Class 10 and Class 20 had narrow fireboxes.  The Class 30 and Class 60 had wide fireboxes.

See also
 Model Engineer magazine
 Minimum-gauge railway
 Ridable miniature railway
 Romney, Hythe and Dymchurch Railway
 Live steam

References

Derick Head "Bassett-Lowke Waterline Ship Models", New Cavendish Books; 
 Fuller, Roland; Levy Allen  "The Bassett-Lowke Story", New Cavendish,  / 9780904568349
 Mosley, D. and van Zeller, P. (1986) Fifteen inch gauge railways : their history, equipment and operation, Newton Abbot : David & Charles,

External links 

 
 Bassett-Lowke Society
 Lickey Incline Preserved Rail Resources
 Acetrains.co.uk
 Bassett-Lowke collection, Brighton Toy and Model Museum
 Bassett-Lowke Trains – The Train Collectors Association

Hornby Railways
Model railroad manufacturers
Toy train manufacturers
15 in gauge railways
Locomotive manufacturers of the United Kingdom
Fairbourne Railway
Companies based in Northampton
Model manufacturers of the United Kingdom